Graffito is the singular form of the Italian graffiti, meaning "little scratch".

Graffito may also refer to:

Graffito (archaeology)
Graffito (drawing technique)
Graffito of Esmet-Akhom

See also
Graffiti (disambiguation)